The 2015–16 LigaPro (also known as Ledman LigaPro for sponsorship reasons) was the 26th season of Portuguese football's second-tier league, and the first season under the current LigaPro title. A total of 24 teams competed in this division, including five reserve sides from top-flight Primeira Liga teams. The season began on 7 August 2015 and concluded on 14 May 2016.

Porto B were crowned champions, becoming the first reserve team to win the second-tier championship title in Portugal. Chaves and Feirense finished in the second and third places, respectively, securing promotion to the 2016–17 Primeira Liga. Farense, Mafra, Atlético CP, Oriental and Oliveirense were relegated to the 2016–17 Campeonato de Portugal.

Teams
A total of 24 teams contested the league, including 19 sides from the 2014–15 season, two teams relegated from the 2014–15 Primeira Liga (Gil Vicente and Penafiel) and three promoted from the 2014–15 Campeonato Nacional de Seniores (Mafra, Famalicão and Varzim).

Other team changes compared to the previous season included the promotion of Tondela and União da Madeira to the 2015–16 Primeira Liga, and the relegation of Marítimo B, Trofense and Beira-Mar to the 2015–16 Campeonato de Portugal.

On 19 June 2015, the LPFP announced that five teams, instead of three, would be relegated to the third tier to reduce the number of teams in the 2016–17 LigaPro season to 22.

Stadia and locations

Personnel and sponsors

Coaching changes

Season summary

League table

Positions by round

Results

Statistics

Top scorers

Sources: LPFP, Zerozero

Monthly awards

References 

Liga Portugal 2 seasons
2015–16 in Portuguese football leagues
Portugal